Song at Eventide is a 1934 British musical film directed by Harry Hughes and starring Fay Compton, Lester Matthews and Nancy Burne. The screenplay concerns a top cabaret singer who is blackmailed in a scandal that threatens to ruin her and her family.

Partial cast
 Fay Compton - Helen d'Alaste 
 Lester Matthews - Lord Belsize 
 Nancy Burne - Patricia Belsize 
 Leslie Perrins - Ricardo 
 Tom Helmore - Michael Law 
 Minnie Rayner - Blondie 
 O. B. Clarence - Registrar 
 Tully Comber - Jim 
 Barbara Gott - Anna 
 Charles Paton - Director

References

External links

1934 films
1934 musical films
Films directed by Harry Hughes
British black-and-white films
British musical films
1930s English-language films
1930s British films